Kharkhorin Rock, also Kharkarin Rock or Phallic Rock, is a large statue of a penis raised on a platform on the steppe, located near Erdene Zuu Monastery (part of the World Heritage Site entitled Orkhon Valley Cultural Landscape) in Kharkhorin, Övörkhangai Province of Mongolia. The phallic rock statue has dual functions; primarily it is a reminder to the monks to remain celibate, but it is also a symbol of fertility and human life. The newer, five metre tall stone statue also pictured on this page is incorrectly referenced as also being located near Kharkhorin, however, its location is noted by some as not being near the former capital city Kharkhorin, but near the smaller town of Khankhongor, much further south, in a different region. In fact, very few travel sites and blogs by frequent visitors to Kharkhorin report seeing this larger statue near the monastery. However it was removed soon after due to local people's heavy discontent

Legend
Legend states that a monk who had vowed to be celibate had turned out to be a womanizer. As punishment he was castrated to remind him of his vows of celibacy. As a warning to the other inmate monks of the monastery, a rock in the shape of a penis was prominently engraved as a stone phallus called "Kharkhorin Rock" within walking distance from the monastery, to remind them that they should not be indulging in any sexual activity with the local women.

Access
The river flowing in this basaltic rocky area originates from the Gyatruu range to Kharkhorin soum. It is accessed from the main road by a well-used path. Many visitors seek the opportunity to visit the original statue, and many women also approach the site to seek blessings for a child to be born to them. The smaller,  stone phallus is located within the grounds of the monastery itself, just to the northeast of the main monastery building.

There are also four rocks in the shape of turtles (considered to be symbols of protection and eternity) marking the four cardinal directions of the monastery's ancient boundary limits. The stones are inscribed with their past history on the back.

See also

Phallic Rock in Arizona
Phallic architecture
Cock rock

References

Sources

External links
Photograph of the main statue
Photograph of the small statue, other angle

Phallic monuments
Övörkhangai Province
Mongolian culture
Monuments and memorials in Mongolia